Chip Neiman is a rancher, American politician, and Republican member of the Wyoming House of Representatives, representing the 1st district since January 12, 2021.

Career
The Neiman family has been involved in logging and timber production in northeast Wyoming and the Black Hills since 1936.

On August 18, 2020, Neiman defeated incumbent state representative, Tyler Lindholm, in the Republican primary for the Wyoming House of Representatives seat representing the 1st district. Neiman won by fewer than 200 votes. On November 3, 2020, Neiman was elected to this position, unopposed. Neiman was sworn in on January 4, 2021.

Neiman was elected as the Republican nominee for majority floor leader in the state House of Representatives in November 2022. The appointment was seen as representing “the growing power of a more conservative wing of the Republican Party”.

Personal life
Neiman lives in Hulett, Wyoming. His wife is named Joni, and they have two children and four grandchildren. Neiman is Christian and attends Hulett Assemblies of God, a church affiliated with the Assemblies of God. He is also affiliated with Vocations for Orphans and the Greater Hulett Community Center.

References

21st-century American politicians
Living people
Republican Party members of the Wyoming House of Representatives
People from Crook County, Wyoming
Year of birth missing (living people)